Mehmet Ümit Yesin (January 28, 1954 – March 19, 2019) was a Turkish stage and film actor. Yesin was best known for his portrayals as Şeker Kazım on Çiçek Taksi, Duran Ertürk on Akasya Durağı, and Korkut Bozok in Yeni Gelin. Mainly in supporting comedic roles, Yesin appeared in over 100 film and television productions during his career.

Early life
Yesin was born on January 28, 1954, in Ankara. Yesin and his family would back and forth frequently between Ankara and Istanbul before settling in Istanbul in 1969.

Career
Encouraged by Muammer Karaca, Yeshin began his acting studies at the Bakırköy Municipal Theater in 1970.

Yeshin made his film debut in the 1985 Şerif Gören film Kurbağalar.

Personal life
Yesin married Turkish actress Evin Esen in 1987. The couple divorced in 2011.

Death
Yesin died on March 19, 2019, following a heart valve surgery he underwent a month prior. A memorial service was held for Yesin on March 20, 2019, at Kadıköy Haldun Taner Stage.

References

External links
 

1954 births
2019 deaths
People from Ankara
Turkish male film actors
21st-century Turkish male actors
20th-century Turkish male actors
20th-century Muslims
21st-century Muslims
Turkish male television actors